The following lists events that happened during 1906 in New Zealand.

Incumbents

Regal and viceregal
Head of State – Edward VII
Governor – The Lord Plunket GCMG KCVO

Government
Speaker of the House – Arthur Guinness (Liberal)
Prime Minister – Richard Seddon (until 10 June) then William Hall-Jones (until 6 August), then Joseph Ward (all Liberal)
Minister of Finance – Richard Seddon (until 10 June) then William Hall-Jones (until 6 August), then Joseph Ward
 Attorney-General – Albert Pitt	(until 18 Nov) then John Findlay (both Liberal)
Chief Justice – Sir Robert Stout

Parliamentary opposition
 Leader of the Opposition – William Massey, (Independent).

Main centre leaders
Mayor of Auckland – Arthur Myers
Mayor of Wellington – Thomas Hislop
Mayor of Christchurch – Charles Gray then John Hall
Mayor of Dunedin – Joseph Braithwaite then George Lawrence

Events

January

February

March

April

May

June
10 June: Prime Minister Richard Seddon died suddenly in office of a heart attack, ending a 13-year premiership.

July

August
6 August: Sir Joseph Ward was sworn in as Prime Minister, taking over from acting Prime Minister William Hall-Jones.

September

October

November

December

Arts and literature

See 1906 in art, 1906 in literature

Music

See: 1906 in music

Film

See: :Category:1906 film awards, 1906 in film, List of New Zealand feature films, Cinema of New Zealand, :Category:1906 films

Sport

Boxing
National amateur champions
Heavyweight – E. Pearson (Wellington)
Middleweight – A. Nash (Christchurch)
Lightweight – R. Mayze (Christchurch)
Featherweight – J. Godfrey (Auckland)
Bantamweight – B. Tracy (Wellington)

Chess
 The 19th National Championship was held in Auckland, and was won by R.J. Barnes of Wellington, his 5th title.

Golf
The 8th National Amateur Championships were held in Christchurch 
 Men: S.H. Gollan (Napier) – 2nd title
 Women: Mrs Bidwell – 2nd title

Horse racing

Harness racing
 New Zealand Trotting Cup: Belmont M.
 Auckland Trotting Cup: Typewriter

Rugby
 Ranfurly Shield – Auckland successfully defend the shield all season, with wins against Canterbury (29–6), Taranaki (18–5), Southland (48–12) and Wellington (11–5).

Soccer
Provincial league champions:
	Auckland:	North Shore AFC
	Canterbury:	Christchurch Club
	Otago:	Northern
	Southland:	Nightcaps
	Taranaki:	Eltham
	Wellington:	Diamond Wellington

Tennis
 Anthony Wilding wins both the singles and doubles (with Rodney Heath) titles at the Australian Open.

Births
 19 January: Robin Hyde, poet and novelist
 27 February: Mal Matheson, cricketer
 5 April: Ted Morgan, Olympic boxer
 4 July: Leo Lemuel White, photographer, photojournalist, aviator, publisher and writer
 8 August: John Hutton, artist
:Category:1906 births

Deaths
 26 January: Fred Sutton, politician.
 10 June: Richard Seddon, 15th Prime Minister of New Zealand (died in office)
 28 June: Jacob William Heberley, carver.
 6 August: George Waterhouse, 7th Premier of New Zealand (died in UK)
 21 September: Joseph Dransfield, Mayor of Wellington and politician.
 29 October; Henry Jackson, politician
 18 November: Albert Pitt, politician.

See also
History of New Zealand
List of years in New Zealand
Military history of New Zealand
Timeline of New Zealand history
Timeline of New Zealand's links with Antarctica
Timeline of the New Zealand environment

References

External links